The 1990/91 FIS Ski Jumping Europa Cup was the 11th Europa Cup season in ski jumping for men.

Calendar

Men

Standings

Men

Europa Cup vs. Continental Cup 
This was originally last Europa Cup season and is also recognized as the first Continental Cup season by International Ski Federation although under this name began its first official season in 1993/94.

References 

FIS Ski Jumping Europa Cup
1990 in ski jumping
1991 in ski jumping